El Dorado Airport  is an airport serving the town of El Dorado in the Bolívar state of Venezuela.

The El Dorado non-directional beacon (Ident: ELO) is located on the field.

See also

Transport in Venezuela
List of airports in Venezuela

References

External links
OpenStreetMap - El Dorado
OurAirports - El Dorado
SkyVector - El Dorado

Airports in Venezuela